Michael H. Cleary (August 4, 1853 – February 2, 1933) was a politician, physician, and lawyer.

Cleary was born on a farm in Walworth County, Wisconsin. He went to the local public schools. In 1877, he received his medical degree from the University of Cincinnati College of Medicine. In 1878, Cleary moved to Galena, Illinois and practiced medicine. Cleary also studied law and was admitted to the Illinois bar. He served as the Galena City Attorney. Cleary also served on the Galena Board of Education and was president of the board of education. Cleary served in the Illinois House of Representatives from 1883 to 1889 and was a Democrat. Cleary also served in the Illinois Senate from 1913 to 1917. Cleary died at the home of Thomas Smith in Dubuque, Iowa.

Notes

1853 births
1933 deaths
People from Galena, Illinois
People from Walworth County, Wisconsin
University of Cincinnati College of Medicine alumni
Illinois lawyers
Physicians from Illinois
School board members in Illinois
Democratic Party members of the Illinois House of Representatives
Democratic Party Illinois state senators